10th Central Committee may refer to:
Central Committee of the 10th Congress of the Russian Communist Party (Bolsheviks), 1921–1922
10th Central Committee of the Bulgarian Communist Party, 1971–1976
10th Central Committee of the Chinese Communist Party, 1973–1977
10th Central Committee of the Socialist Unity Party of Germany, 1981–1986
10th Central Committee of the Polish United Workers' Party, 1986–1990
10th Central Committee of the Romanian Communist Party, 1969–1974
10th Central Committee of the Lao People's Revolutionary Party, 2016–2021
10th Central Committee of the Communist Party of Vietnam, 2006–2001
10th Central Committee of the League of Communists of Yugoslavia, 1974–1978
10th Central Committee of the Hungarian Socialist Workers' Party, 1970–1975